Disney Q Family Mastermind is a television game show that aired on Disney Channel India. It is the reworked version of the popular BBC TV series, Mastermind, tweaked to include families as participants. The show is hosted by Benjamin Gilani.

Format
There are four rounds for each contestant family. 
Each contestant family usually has two minutes per round. 
In the first round, the smallest member of each family has to give answers of General Knowledge questions while in Second round each family has to choose a special subject the contestants can pass if they do not know the answer. 
If a question is answered incorrectly, the questioner will give the answer, using valuable time. 
After the two minutes is up a buzzer is sounded, which is made up of four beeps; if a question is being read (or has just been read), then the contestant is given a short period of time to answer.
In the third round, each family has to choose a member from their family who will give answer to the chosen subject. 
In the final round, again, General Knowledge questions are asked but this time with negative marking. 
After each round the scores of the contestant family are announced. 
After the end of fourth round the winner is announced.

References

2013 Indian television series debuts
Disney Channel (Indian TV channel) original programming
Quiz shows
Indian game shows
2013 Indian television series endings
Indian television series based on British television series
Hindi-language television shows